Nicolás López Macri (born 2 March 1990 in Rosario (Santa Fe), Argentina) is an Argentine footballer currently playing for Sportivo Belgrano of the Primera B Nacional in Argentina.

He is 177 cm in height and weighs 70 kg. Right winger is his main position.

Teams
  Newell's Old Boys 2009–2011
  Instituto de Córdoba 2011–2014
  → Santiago Wanderers 2013–2014 (loan)
  Aldosivi 2014–2015
  Sportivo Belgrano 2015–

References

 Profile at BDFA 
 

1990 births
Living people
Argentine footballers
Argentine expatriate footballers
Newell's Old Boys footballers
Instituto footballers
Aldosivi footballers
Santiago Wanderers footballers
Chilean Primera División players
Expatriate footballers in Chile
Association football forwards
Footballers from Rosario, Santa Fe